Slingshot Dakota is an American rock band from Bethlehem, Pennsylvania.

History
Slingshot Dakota formed in Long Island in 2003 as a three-piece, issuing their debut, Keener Sighs, in 2004. At the time, the group was composed of Carly Comando, Pat Schramm (of the band Latterman) and Jeff Cunningham. In the spring of 2005, Schramm was replaced by Patterson. In the fall of 2006, Cunningham left the band, and the band remained a two-piece. In November of 2007, the band released its sophomore effort, Their Dreams Are Dead, but Ours Is the Golden Ghost!. The group's third full-length, Dark Hearts, was released in November of 2012, after the group signed with Topshelf Records.

Comando also scored the short video Everyday by Noah Kalina and the documentary film Lily Topples the World.

Members
Current
Carly Comando – keys, vocals (2003–present)
Tom Patterson – drums, vocals (2005–present)

Former
Jeff Cunningham – guitar, vocals (2003–2006)
Pat Schramm – drums (2003–2005)

Discography
Keener Sighs - Immigrant Sun Records (2004)
Their Dreams Are Dead, But Ours Is the Golden Ghost! - Self-released (2007)
Dark Hearts - Topshelf Records (2012)
Break - Topshelf Records (2016)
Heavy Banding - Community Records (USA), Specialist Subject Records (UK/EU) (2019)

References

Musical groups from Pennsylvania
American musical duos
Topshelf Records artists
Specialist Subject Records artists